Davud Kola-ye Estaneh Sar (also Romanized as Dāvūd Kolā-ye Estāneh Sar; also known as Dāvūd Kolā-ye Bālā) is a village in Lalehabad Rural District, Lalehabad District, Babol County, Mazandaran Province, Iran. At the 2006 census, its population was 352, in 94 families.

References 

Populated places in Babol County